Denise Emerson (born 13 May 1960) is an Australian former cricketer who played as a right-handed batter. She appeared in seven Test matches and 21 One Day Internationals for Australia between 1982 and 1987, including playing at the 1982 World Cup. She played domestic cricket for Western Australia and New South Wales.

Her brother Terry Alderman played at Test level for the Australian men's team. She is married to the umpire Ross Emerson.

References

External links
 
 
 Denise Emerson at southernstars.org.au

1960 births
Living people
Cricketers from Perth, Western Australia
Australia women Test cricketers
Australia women One Day International cricketers
Western Australia women cricketers
New South Wales Breakers cricketers